Miss Universe Japan 2019 was the 22nd edition of Miss Universe Japan that was held on August 22, 2019. Yuumi Kato of Mie Prefecture crowned Ako Kamo of Hyōgo Prefecture as her successor at the end of the event.

Results

Placements

Special Awards

Contestants

References

External links

Japan
Beauty pageants in Japan
Japanese awards
2019 beauty pageants